Hyphen Hyphen is a French electropop band from Nice. The four-member band has released three albums — Times (2015), Times & Lives (2016) and HH (2018) — two EPs and a number of singles. Their new album "C'est la Vie" is released the 20th of January 2023.

History 
The band was formed at the Conservatory of Nice, when all four members were studying Plastic Arts. Santa and Adam are childhood friends, and met the other two band members in high school.

They self-released their two EPs, titled Chewbacca I'm Your Mother (March 2011) and Wild Union (May 2012). The first elements from their current visual identity began showing with these projects, including tribal signs. They would later use the term Wild Union to describe the bond they formed both within the band and with their ever-growing audience.

Since 2010, the four musicians have taken part in many national and regional music contests.
They notably won the Prix du Jury of Les Inrocks Lab in 2011, the Biennale des Jeunes Créateurs d'Europe et de Méditerranée in 2011 and made it to the 2012 Printemps de Bourges finals. Hyphen Hyphen also won FAIR 2013, détours ADAMI 2013 and Best Live 2013 with the two French bands Skip the Use and C2C.

After many performances in the Provence-Alpes-Côte d'Azur region, Hyphen Hyphen started performing all over France including high-profile festivals such as Solidays in 2012 and 2013, Rock en Seine in 2012 or Eurockéennes de Belfort in 2013.

In 2014, they started working on their debut album Times, with all tracks written, composed, arranged and produced by the four members. The album was released in France in September 2015.

On 12 February 2016, they won the Award for Revelation Scene (Best New Live act) at Victoires de la Musique, the French Music Awards.

They released their second album "HH" in May 2018  and went on tour for over one and a half-year. They performed more than 150 shows all around France, Belgium and Switzerland.

On 22 March 2019, they released internationally the single Lonely Baby (feat Kiiara).

A five dates North American tour (Toronto, Montréal, New York, San Francisco and Los Angeles) is announced at the beginning of 2020. The tour will be unfortunately cancelled due to COVID.

During the year 2020-2021 the band began the writing and production of their third album which will be called "C'est la Vie". They wrote and autoproduced most of the songs during lockdown. The album is recorded in Brussels (ICP Studio) where the band recorded their first album Times in 2015. This new album will be released on 20th January 2023. They surrounded themselves with Glenn Ballard, American producer who worked with Alanis Morissette, No Doubt or Katy Perry as well as Mike “Spike” Stent (Madonna, Beyoncé, Lady Gaga, Coldplay, Muse, Linkin Park, Oasis, Bastille) and Dan Grech ( Halsey, George Ezra, The Vaccines, Lana Del Rey, Keane, Moby) for the mixing parts.

The band will play a first batch of new songs in New York during the Sumerstage festival in June 21st 2022.

Hyphen Hyphen released the first single of their new album "Don't Wait for Me" the 13rd May 2022. Still in May the band released the single "Too Young" which is chosen by the French TV TF1 and FIFA to be the official hymn for UEFA Women's EURO 2022. 

In September 2022 the band officially announced their new European Tour called "C'est la vie Tour" and will perform in France, Belgium, Switzerland and Luxemburg starting in January 2023. 

At the beginning of December, they released their third single "Call my Name"

Hyphen Hyphen did a intimate Release Show the 5th of December 2022 in Paris. This show marks the come back of the band on stage with new songs.

The kick off of this new tour was made on January 18th in Rouen.

Members 
The four-member band is composed of:
 Santa – lead vocals, guitar and synth
 Adam – guitar, keys, vocals
 Line – bass, vocals
 Zaccharie (or Zac) – drums and pads (left the band in 2016)
 Zoé Hochberg – replaces Zac on drums

Santa is of both French and American descent and the daughter of a singer. She trained with Guy Roche, vocal coach of singers including Beyoncé and Christina Aguilera.

Discography

Albums

EP 
 Chewbacca I Am Your Mother (March 2011)
 Wild Union (May 2012)

Singles 

*Did not appear in the official Belgian Ultratop 50 charts, but rather in the bubbling under Ultratip charts.
**Did not appear in the official Belgian Ultratop 50 charts nor the bubbling under Ultratip charts, but was registered in the Ultratip charts as an extra tip.

Other charting songs

Songwriting 
2020: Ali - "Paris me dit (Yalla ya helo!)" - (Finalist for Eurovision France, c'est vous qui décidez! for selecting representative to Eurovision Song Contest

References 

 Hyphen Hyphen: «Nice est la ville idéale pour composer» sur 20minutes.fr
 Hyphen Hyphen - Just Need Your Love - Le Petit Journal du 29/09 sur canalplus.fr
 Hyphen Hyphen au Printemps de Bourges 2015 sur francetvinfo.fr

External links 
 Hyphen Hyphen sur ouifm.fr

Musical groups established in 2009
French pop music groups
French rock music groups
Organizations based in Nice
Musical groups from Provence-Alpes-Côte d'Azur